First Collection 2006–2009 is a Fleet Foxes compilation, released on 9 November 2018 to mark the tenth anniversary of their debut album. It is a special limited-edition collection.

Track listing

Disc one: Fleet Foxes

Disc two: Sun Giant EP

Disc three: Fleet Foxes EP

Disc four: B-Sides & Rarities

Personnel

Fleet Foxes
Fleet Foxes
Robin Pecknold – band member, songwriter, arranger, design (uncredited: lead vocals, guitar)
Skyler Skjelset – band member, arranger (uncredited: lead guitar)
Nicholas Peterson – band member, arranger (uncredited: drums, percussion, vocals)
Casey Wescott – band member, arranger (uncredited: keyboards, vocals)
Craig Curran – band member, arranger (uncredited: bass, vocals)

Additional instrumental personnel
Gwen Owen – flute on "Your Protector"

Production personnel
Phil Ek – producer, engineer, mixer

Sun Giant
The liner notes state that: "We all played many an instrument. An itemized and individualized list would be egotistical and tiresome"
Robin Pecknold – [lead] vocals, various instruments [uncredited: guitar]
Skyler Skjelset – various instruments [uncredited: lead guitar, mandolin, vocals]
Casey Wescott – various instruments [uncredited: piano, keyboards, vocals]
Christian Wargo – various instruments [uncredited: bass, guitar, vocals]
Nicholas Peterson – various instruments [uncredited: drums, percussion, vocals]

Production personnel
Phil Ek – producer, engineer, mixer

Mastering personnel
Ed Brooks – mastering

References

2018 compilation albums
Bella Union albums
Fleet Foxes albums
Sub Pop compilation albums